Meningohydroencephalocoele (AmE: meningohydroencephalocele) is a form of meningocele (AmE) - a developmental abnormality of the central nervous system.

Like meningocoele, meningohydroencephalocoele is caused by defects in bone ossification; in particular, the intramembranous ossification related to the closure of infantile fontanelles. It refers to the protrusion of the meninges between the un-fused bones, to lie subcutaneously.
 Meningocoele - refers to herniation of meninges.
 Meningoencephalocoele refers to the condition if brain tissue is included with the meninges in the herniation.
 Meningohydroencephalocoele refers to the condition including meninges, brain tissue and part of the ventricular system in the herniation.

Encephalocoele defects occur in approximately 1 in 2000 live births.

References

External links 
 Transphenoidal meningohydroencephalocoele, Durham et al. - PubMed

Congenital disorders